Believe Acoustic is the third remix album by Canadian singer Justin Bieber. It was released on January 29, 2013 through Island Records as the follow-up to his second remix album Never Say Never: The Remixes (2011). The release also marks Bieber's second acoustic album, following My Worlds Acoustic (2010). The album features acoustic and live versions of songs from his third studio album Believe (2012), as well as three new recordings. The album went to number one on the US Billboard 200 albums chart, making this Bieber's fifth number-one album and seventh consecutive top 10 album in the United States.

Background
Bieber confirmed the project on December 8, 2012, by tweeting "Been writing a lot...new stuff...and yeah. the acoustic album, new arrangements, is happening". The track listing for the (then) EP was revealed on December 22, 2012, featuring 8 tracks. On January 6, 2013 it was announced that 11 tracks would be featured on the album instead, including new songs "Nothing Like Us" "Yellow Raincoat" and "I Would".

Critical reception

Believe Acoustic received generally mixed reviews from music critics. Robert Copsey of Digital Spy wrote that the removal of the multi-layered production and "studio trickery" on Believe reveals a "smoother and less [...] babyish vocal than most will be familiar with". He noted that "embarrassingly weak lyrics" is a recurring issue throughout the album, though it's "largely saved" by Kanter, who "ensures the melodic hooks remain largely intact". He noted that it's "less of an issue" on the album's three new songs. He concluded that: "we'd prefer the polished, shinier and glossier Justin Bieber any day". Andrew Leahy of The Washington Times cited Believe Acoustic to be a way of "squeezing extra cash out of material that already has been released". He wrote that only a few of the new arrangements "shine any new light" on the original versions.

Andy Kellman of Allmusic wrote that like My Worlds Acoustic (2010), Believe Acoustic "maintains the flow of Bieber product following a proper studio album". He noted that the "playful side" of Believe is not "well-suited for earnest, stripped-down renderings": "Party anthems like 'Beauty and a Beat' and lines like 'Chillin' by the fire while we eatin' fondue,' from 'Boyfriend,' seem silly when performed with the singer in serious artist mode." Jody Rosen of Rolling Stone wrote that as "cash-grab" remix albums go, Believe Acoustic offers a "little added value, for hardcore fans, at least." According to Rosen, the acoustic versions of "blustery" dance-pop songs like "All Around the World" and "Beauty and a Beat" sound "a tad wan", with "a six-string standing in for the synths and bludgeoning rhythms". She, however, stated that Bieber "gives the songs his best, and his raspy, soulful vocal tone stands out nicely against the stark musical backdrop". Rosen cited the best songs on the album to be the three new studio tracks.

On February 9, 2013, Bieber gave a debut performance of "Nothing Like Us", a bonus track on Believe Acoustic on Saturday Night Live. He served as both the host and musical guest and also performed an acoustic set of "As Long as You Love Me".

Track listing

Note: (*) denotes a co-producer

Personnel
Credits adapted from album's liner notes.

 Justin Bieber — vocals (all tracks), producer (tracks 1–9, 11), guitar (tracks 8, 9)
 Tim Carmon — grand piano (track 1)
 Aaron Michael Cox — producer and instrumentation (track 10)
 Da Internz — producers (track 10)
 Josh Gudwin — co-producer and engineer (tracks 1–9, 11)
 Wizard Jones — grand piano (track 6)
 Jaycen Joshua — mixing (track 10)
 Dan Kanter — producer (tracks 1-8), guitar (tracks 1–5, 8)
 Dave Kutch — mastering
 Manny Marroquin — mixing (tracks 1–5, 7, 9)
 Tom Strahle — guitar (tracks 7, 9), producer (track 9)
 Phil Tan — mixing (tracks 6, 8, 11)

Charts

Weekly charts

Year-end charts

Certifications

References

Island Records albums
Justin Bieber albums
Island Records remix albums
2013 remix albums